Chachiot was one of the 68 constituencies in the Himachal Pradesh Legislative Assembly of Himachal Pradesh a northern state of India. It was also part of Mandi Lok Sabha constituency.

Member of Legislative Assembly
 1951: Krishna Chandar, Indian National Congress
 1951: Piru, Indian National Congress
 1967: Karam Singh, Indian National Congress
 1972: Karam Singh, Indian National Congress
 1977: Moti Ram, Janata Party
 1982: Moti Ram, Independent
 1985: Shivlal Sharma, Indian National Congress
 1990: Moti Ram, Janata Dal
 1993: Moti Ram, Indian National Congress

Election results

2007

See also
 List of constituencies of Himachal Pradesh Legislative Assembly

References

External links
HP official website of the Chief Electoral Officer

Former assembly constituencies of Himachal Pradesh
Mandi district